Bachimanchi Venkata Subrahmanyam Ravi, better known as B. V. S. Ravi or Macha Ravi, is an Indian screenwriter and dialogue writer who works in Telugu films.

Career

He assisted Posani Krishna Murali for films such as Sivayya, Seetharamaraju, Preyasi Raave, Snehithulu, Ayodhya Raamayya, Badhrachalam.

He became a director for the film Wanted in 2011, casting Gopichand and Deeksha Seth in lead roles with music by Chakri. In 2012, he provided story for the controversial hit film Denikaina Ready. He co-wrote Cameraman Gangatho Rambabu, Iddarammayilatho and Devudu Chesina Manushulu along with Puri Jagganath.

BVS Ravi turned as a producer for the film, Second Hand, with which he showcased his management and creative skills by completing the movie visually and technically brilliant in low-budget. BVS Ravi was the first producer to materialize the concept of single-shot cinematography in the Telugu film industry.

He is a close associate of Ram Gopal Varma, Puri Jagannath, Krishna Vamsi, Rana Daggubati, Allu Arjun, Ravi Teja, Dil Raju, Mohan Babu, Manchu Vishnu and Manchu Lakshmi Prasanna.

Filmography

As a director

As a producer

As an actor

As a screenwriter

References

External links 
 
BVS Ravi on Twitter

Indian male screenwriters
Living people
1974 births
Telugu film directors
Telugu screenwriters
Screenwriters from Andhra Pradesh
Film directors from Andhra Pradesh
Artists from Vijayawada
21st-century Indian film directors
Telugu film producers
Film producers from Andhra Pradesh